The Mississauga Horse was a cavalry regiment of the Non-Permanent Active Militia of the Canadian Militia (now the Canadian Army). In 1936, they were amalgamated with The Governor General's Body Guard to form The Governor General's Horse Guards.

Lineage 
 1 April 1901: Toronto Mounted Rifles formed from J and K Squadrons Canadian Mounted Rifles
 1 April 1903: 9th Toronto Light Horse
 1 May 1905: 9th Mississauga Horse
 15 Mar 1920: The Ontario Mounted Rifles
 1 April 1924: The Mississauga Horse
 15 December 1936: amalgamated with The Governor General's Body Guard, to form The Governor General's Horse Guards

Perpetuations 
 4th Regiment, Canadian Mounted Rifles
 7th Regiment, Canadian Mounted Rifles
 216th Battalion (Bantams), CEF

History 
It was originally formed as the Toronto Mounted Rifles at Toronto, Ontario on April 1, 1901, by combining J and K Squadrons of the Canadian Mounted Rifles with three newly raised companies. In 1903 the regiment was renamed to the 9th Toronto Light Horse and in 1907 it was renamed to the 9th Mississauga Horse. This was a reference to the First Nation that inhabited the area before the Europeans, the Mississaugas.

The 9th Mississauga Horse contributed many volunteers to the Canadian Expeditionary Force during World War I, in particular to the 75th Battalion and the 170th (Mississauga Horse) Battalion, CEF.

In 1920 the regiment was renamed The Ontario Mounted Rifles and in 1924 it was renamed The Mississauga Horse. The regimental march was John Peel.

On 15 December 1936, as part of the 1936 Canadian Militia Reorganization, the regiment was amalgamated with The Governor General's Body Guard to form The Governor General's Horse Guards, an armoured militia (i.e., part-time reservist) regiment, which still exists today as part of 32 Canadian Brigade Group in Toronto.

Organization

9th Toronto Light Horse (01 April, 1903) 

 A Squadron (Toronto, Ontario)
 B Squadron (Toronto, Ontario)
 C Squadron (Toronto, Ontario)
 D Squadron (Toronto, Ontario)

The Ontario Mounted Rifles (01 May, 1921) 

 Regimental Headquarters (Toronto, Ontario)
 A Squadron (Toronto, Ontario)
 B Squadron (Toronto, Ontario)
 C Squadron (Toronto, Ontario)

Battle honours 
In 1929 the regiment was awarded battle honours for the Great War.
 Mount Sorrel
 Somme, 1916
 Flers-Courcelette
 Ancre Heights
 Arras, 1917, '18
 Vimy, 1917
 Hill 70
 Ypres, 1917
 Passchendaele
 Amiens
 Scarpe, 1918
 Hindenburg Line
 Canal du Nord
 Cambrai, 1918
 Valenciennes
 Sambre
 France and Flanders, 1915–18

Notable members
Billy Bishop: World War I flying ace
Brigadier Leslie Booth

See Also 

 List of regiments of cavalry of the Canadian Militia (1900–1920)

References

Cavalry regiments of Canada
Military units and formations established in 1901
Military units and formations disestablished in 1936
Military units and formations of Ontario